Akhil Bharatiya Marathi Sahitya Sammelan (All India Marathi Literary Conference) is an annual conference for literary discussions by Marathi writers. Marathi is the official language of Maharashtra State. The first Marathi Sahitya Sammelan was held in Pune in 1878 under the chairmanship of Justice Mahadev Govind Ranade.

Conferences held 
Following is the list of the conferences with year and venue:

Women presidents
Only five women have been the presidents of the Sammelan to date:

References

Marathi-language writers
Culture of Maharashtra
Indic literature societies